The Europe Zone was one of the three regional zones of the 1961 Davis Cup.

28 teams entered the Europe Zone, with the winner going on to compete in the Inter-Zonal Zone against the winners of the America Zone and Eastern Zone. Italy defeated Sweden in the final and progressed to the Inter-Zonal Zone.

Draw

First round

Belgium vs. Chile

Switzerland vs. Netherlands

Czechoslovakia vs. West Germany

Ireland vs. Poland

Monaco vs. Luxembourg

Egypt vs. Brazil

Austria vs. Norway

Turkey vs. Finland

Romania vs. South Africa

Yugoslavia vs. Spain

Israel vs. New Zealand

Denmark vs. Hungary

Second round

Belgium vs. Italy

Netherlands vs. West Germany

Poland vs. Monaco

France vs. Brazil

Austria vs. Great Britain

Finland vs. South Africa

Spain vs. New Zealand

Hungary vs. Sweden

Quarterfinals

West Germany vs. Italy

Poland vs. France

Great Britain vs. South Africa

Spain vs. Sweden

Semifinals

France vs. Italy

Sweden vs. Great Britain

Final

Italy vs. Sweden

References

External links
Davis Cup official website

Davis Cup Europe/Africa Zone
Europe Zone
Davis Cup